Johnny Foreigner vs Everything is the third studio album by British indie rock band Johnny Foreigner. It was released on CD and MP3 on 5 December 2011 through Alcopop! Records, and on Double Vinyl LP in Summer 2012. The record marked their first studio album to be released without the aid of a Grammy-nominated producer (Machine producing their first record, Alex Newport producing their second); as well as their first studio album not released on Best Before Records. The album cover, as with their other albums, features drawings by Lewes Herriot.

The album was assigned a Metacritic rating of 66, indicating "generally favourable reviews". Some controversy arose when the NME website chose a writer who had already had disagreements with the band's lead singer Alexei to review the album. This writer gave the album a highly negative review and a score of 3.0/10. This was responded to with a backlash by fans and readers alike, who together used the NME's album rating system to give the album a score of 9.4/10.

The double vinyl version of the album adds the Certain Songs are Cursed EP—minus the original mix of "What Drummers Get"—and two original songs from the (Don't) Show Us Your Fangs and You vs Everything singles.

Track listing

References

Johnny Foreigner albums
2011 albums
Alcopop! Records albums